God's Own Country is a 2017 British romantic drama film written and directed by Francis Lee in his feature directorial debut. The film stars Josh O'Connor and Alec Secăreanu. The plot follows a young sheep farmer in Yorkshire whose life is transformed by a Romanian migrant worker.

Upon release, the film received widespread acclaim from critics, who praised the performances (particularly O'Connor's) and story, as well as commending it as a promising start for Lee. It was the only UK-based production to feature in the world drama category at the 2017 Sundance Film Festival, where it won the world cinema directing award.

Plot
In Yorkshire, Johnny lives on the family farm with his father, Martin, and grandmother, Deirdre. Due to his father having suffered a stroke and his grandmother's age, much of the day-to-day running of the farm falls to Johnny. In his free time, Johnny engages in binge drinking and furtive sexual encounters with other men. Returning late to the farm after such an encounter with a young auctioneer, he is berated by his father because a calf has died from a breech birth in his absence.

Gheorghe, a Romanian migrant worker, is hired as extra help for the lambing season. He arrives and spends his first night in a caravan that the family has organised as his accommodation. As the ewes have moved away from the main part of the farm, and as part of the farm's boundary wall remains unrepaired by Johnny, it is decided that Johnny and Gheorghe should spend several days camping nearer to the animals. When one of the ewes gives birth to an unconscious runt, Johnny is intrigued when Gheorghe is able to resuscitate and care for it. One morning, after Johnny refers to Gheorghe yet again as a "gypsy", Gheorghe tackles him to the ground and warns Johnny not to speak that way to him again.

The next day, the two men again engage in a fight which results in Johnny performing fellatio on Gheorghe and the two men have rough and passionate sex in the dirt. While Johnny initially does not acknowledge the encounter, the two share cigarettes and a sugar packet for their cup noodles throughout the day. That night, Gheorghe resists Johnny's aggressive move to have sex, instead patiently showing him that sex can also be tender, and the two men kiss for the first time.

Returning to the farm, Johnny invites Gheorghe to stay with him in the house, but Gheorghe elects to remain in the caravan. When Martin suffers a second stroke, Johnny realises that the running of the farm is now entirely his responsibility, and asks Gheorghe if he will stay with him. When Gheorghe expresses uncertainty over whether they can stay together and maintain the farm simultaneously, Johnny reacts poorly, drinking to excess and engaging in another random sexual encounter. When Gheorghe realises what Johnny has done, he abruptly leaves the farm.

Martin is released from the hospital but is now fully debilitated. Johnny, desperate to make up with Gheorghe, tells his father that he will stay to run the farm, but that things must be run on his terms. Martin gives his tacit approval to Johnny, who sets off to bring Gheorghe back to the farm. After he finds Gheorghe working in Scotland, the two men reconcile. Gheorghe returns with Johnny; the caravan is taken away, and Gheorghe moves into the house.

Cast
 Josh O'Connor as Johnny Saxby
 Alec Secăreanu as Gheorghe Ionescu
 Gemma Jones as Deirdre Saxby
 Ian Hart as Martin Saxby
Also Harry Lister Smith, Melanie Kilburn, Liam Thomas, Patsy Ferran, Moey Hassan, Naveed Choudhry, Sarah White and John McCrea have been cast in supporting roles.

Production
The film is partly based on writer and director Francis Lee's own life, where he also had to make a decision to either stay and work on his family's farm or go off to drama school.

The film was shot in Yorkshire, specifically around the Silsden area of Keighley in West Yorkshire, with some other scenes being shot in Keighley Bus Station and Airedale General Hospital with Haworth and Otley also featuring as backdrops for the film.

The production was financed in part through the British Film Council's iFeature programme with additional funding being secured from Creative England.

Release
The film had its world premiere at the Sundance Film Festival on 23 January 2017. It was the only production from the United Kingdom that featured in the world drama category in the 2017 Sundance Film Festival. It went onto screen at the Berlin International Film Festival on 11 February 2017.

Shortly after, Picturehouse Entertainment, Orion Pictures and Samuel Goldwyn Films acquired UK and US distribution rights respectively. It was released in the United Kingdom on 1 September 2017. The film was banned in Malaysia, China and some Arab countries due to explicit sex scenes between the two protagonists. Likewise, Romania was the only country in Eastern Europe where the film was screened.

God's Own Country was released on DVD on 30 January 2018.

Reception

Box office
, God's Own Country has grossed a worldwide total of $2.6 million, which includes $1.2 million in the United Kingdom.

Critical response

God's Own Country received critical acclaim. The film holds a 98% approval rating based on 125 reviews, with a weighted average of 7.96/10, on the review aggregator website Rotten Tomatoes. The site's critical consensus reads: "A quiet, moving rumination on loneliness and newfound intimacy, God's Own Country marks an outstanding directorial debut for Francis Lee." On Metacritic, the film holds a rating of 85 out of 100, based on 22 critics, indicating "universal acclaim".

The Sundance Film Festival's listing for God's Own Country says that "you can smell the mud in this movie" while also describing Francis Lee as a major new talent and the film as "one not to be missed." Peter Bradshaw, writing in The Guardian, gave the film four stars out of five. Bradshaw described the film as "an almost, but not quite a Dales Brokeback," and also as a "very British love story, bursting at the seams with unspoken emotions, unvoiced fears about the future, and a readiness to displace every emotion into hard physical work".

At the 2017 Berlin International Film Festival the film received the Harvey Award, presented by the Teddy Awards programme for LGBT-related films in conjunction with a reader jury from the German LGBT magazine Männer.

Ed Potton, writing in The Times, gave the film four stars out of five and described the film as "splendid" and "[a] potent film, a Yorkshire Brokeback Mountain".

Accolades

Notes

References

External links
 
 
 
 
 
Guardian article from April 2017 about the film and fellow "countryside movie" The Levelling

2017 films
2017 romantic drama films
2017 independent films
2017 LGBT-related films
2010s coming-of-age drama films
British coming-of-age drama films
British independent films
British LGBT-related films
British romantic drama films
Coming-of-age romance films
Films about farmers
Films about immigration
Films directed by Francis Lee
Films scored by Dustin O'Halloran
Films set on farms
Films set in Yorkshire
Films shot in Yorkshire
Gay-related films
LGBT-related coming-of-age films
LGBT-related romantic drama films
2010s English-language films
2010s British films